Mr. Belvedere Rings the Bell is a 1951 American comedy film, the third and final one starring Clifton Webb as Lynn Belvedere. It follows on from Sitting Pretty (1948) and Mr. Belvedere Goes to College (1949).

Plot 
Mr. Belvedere is on a lecture tour on the topic "How to be young, though 80". He wonders if there is any point in living to be 80 himself after overhearing four residents of the Church of John old age home talk about their ailments. He decides to embark on an investigation at the home. When he goes to see Bishop Daniels about gaining entry, he is mistaken for Oliver Erwenter, who had applied for admission, but died at age 77. He does not correct the mistake since only the aged are admitted.

After encountering initial skepticism, he has the residents of the facility feeling younger, aided by youth pills from "Tibet" (actually simply sugar pills he concocts at the local drugstore), much to the disapproval of the well-meaning but staid Rev. Charles Watson, the person in charge of the old age home. Belvedere also helps Harriet Tripp, Watson's assistant, with her romance problem: the reverend does not see that she is in love with him. With the help of Emmett, the lecture tour company's advance man, Belvedere makes preparations for a church bazaar to raise funds for the poverty-stricken place.

Watson soon discovers his newest charge's true identity, but he keeps the information to himself after seeing how much good Belvedere has accomplished. However, reporters finally uncover his deception, and the disillusioned senior citizens revert to their cheerless routine. Belvedere manages to convince them that they are only as old as they think they are. Watson also sees the light and proposes to Miss Tripp. His work done, and convinced it is worth his while to live to 80, Belvedere leaves to resume his lecture tour.

Cast
 Clifton Webb as Lynn Belvedere (Oliver Erwenter)
 Joanne Dru as Miss Tripp
 Hugh Marlowe as Rev. Charles Watson
 Zero Mostel as Emmett
 Billy Lynn as Mr. Beebe
 Doro Merande as Mrs. Hammer
 Frances Brandt as Miss Hoadley
 Kathleen Comegys as Mrs. Sampler
 Jane Marbury as Mrs. Gross
 Harry Hines as Mr. Cherry
 Warren Stevens as Reporter

Lynn, Merande, Brandt, Comegys and Marbury all reprised their roles from the Broadway play.

Production 
The film was based on the play The Silver Whistle by Robert E. McEnroe. Although the plot of the film resembles that of the play, Belvedere was not a character in the play. The leading character was a hobo named Oliver Erwenter, played by José Ferrer. The Silver Whistle, with all of its original characters, was telecast in 1959 on Playhouse 90, in which Eddie Albert played the role of Erwenter.

Reception 
Bosley Crowther of The New York Times called the film "a poorly conceived alteration of The Silver Whistle". The play's protagonist, a "cheerful do-gooder", was replaced by Lynn Belvedere, a substitution that Crowther considered a poor fit, writing "it is hard to swallow Mr. Belvedere in such an unlikely place, and we find his airy patronage of the oldsters in decidedly questionable taste". However, he did concede that "Mr. Webb plays the contradictory role with his usual arrogance and flourishes which occasionally are moderately droll" and many of the supporting cast "acquit themselves admirably".

References

External links
 
 
 
 1952 Theatre Guild on the Air radio adaptation of The Silver Whistle at Internet Archive

1951 films
1951 comedy films
20th Century Fox films
American black-and-white films
American comedy films
American sequel films
Films about old age
American films based on plays
Films directed by Henry Koster
Films scored by Cyril J. Mockridge
Films with screenplays by Ranald MacDougall
1950s English-language films
1950s American films